Gottardo Fidele Piazzoni (April 14, 1872 – August 1, 1945) was a Swiss-born American landscape painter, muralist and sculptor of Italian heritage, a key member of the school of Northern California artists in the early 1900s.

Early life 

Piazzoni was born on April 14, 1872, in Intragna, Ticino, Switzerland. He moved at the age of 15 to his father's dairy farm in the Carmel Valley. His uncle Luigi Piazzoni, had the Luigi Piazzoni ranch  adjacent to his father's ranch.  After training with Arthur Frank Mathews at the Mark Hopkins Institute of Art (now the San Francisco Art Institute), Piazzoni trained for three years in Paris at the Académie Julian and under Jean-Léon Gérôme.  He then returned to California to begin his career and set up his own teaching studio.

Specializing in landscapes in a muted palette, most scholars count Piazzoni among the Tonalists, and was one of the most influential exponents of this style in California. He sought out the lighting effects of certain times of day, taking a "special interest in full moonrises, the viewing of which became a family ritual. Venturing up a hill, the family would cheer the appearance of the moon. Piazzoni knew the exact time for each moonrise and kept precise records." He was able to portray the essential qualities of a scene and achieve a strong mood, using only minimal descriptive details.

Piazzoni's best-known public work may be his 14 murals for the former headquarters of the San Francisco Public Library for architect George W. Kelham, ten of them dating from 1932, the other four painted in 1945 and not installed until the 1970s.  After public debate and lawsuits in the late 1990s, the ten principal murals can now be seen at the M. H. de Young Memorial Museum.

By early 1901 Piazzoni was sharing a studio with fellow painter Xavier Martínez, with whom he founded a year later the short-lived California Society of Artists. He was also a co-founder of the California Society of Etchers in 1912, with Robert B. Harshe, art professor at Stanford University; Pedro Joseph de Lemos, professor at San Francisco Art Institute; and Ralph Stackpole, sculptor, printmaker, and at that time Piazzoni's studio assistant.  He enthusiastically advanced the career of sculptor Arthur Putnam.  He was also a member of the Bohemian Club, exhibited with the Berkeley and Monterey art colonies, taught at the San Francisco Art Institute, and served on the jury and advisory committee of the Art Gallery at the Hotel Del Monte.  In 1927 he publicly protested when the directors of the municipal Oakland Art Gallery threatened to remove two displayed paintings of “explicit female nudes.”

Piazzoni was also a good friend of Impressionist Granville Redmond and introduced the deaf-mute artist to Charlie Chaplin.  The relationship of Redmond, Chaplin and Piazzoni is explored in a play by Steve Hauk, "The Floating Hat," published by the Traditional Fine Art Organization, Inc. The play is also in the collection of the Gallaudet University library.

Among his students were George Post, Rinaldo Cuneo, Dorr Bothwell, and Clayton Sumner Price.  American landscape painter Mireille Piazzoni Wood was Piazzoni's daughter, painter-writer Philip Wood his son-in-law.  Artists Thomas Wood and Russell Chatham are Piazzoni grandsons.

Death

Piazzoni died on August 1, 1945, at the Piazzoni ranch home in Carmel Valley. Services were held in San Francisco.. Piazzoni was buried at the Cypress Lawn Memorial Park cemetery, in Colma, California.

Works

Murals

References

External links 
 
 Web resource on the library murals
 Piazzoni's papers at the Archives of American Art

1872 births
1945 deaths
American muralists
19th-century American painters
American male painters
20th-century American painters
Académie Julian alumni
San Francisco Art Institute faculty
Tonalism
19th-century American male artists
20th-century American male artists